ALQ  may refer to:

 Anterior Lateral System, also known as the Spinothalamic tract
 Arab Law Quarterly, a legal magazine
 Alegrete Airport, Brazil (by IATA code)

See also 
 alq, an ISO code for the Algonquin language